Santarcangelo Calcio is an Italian association football club, based in Santarcangelo di Romagna, Emilia-Romagna.

The club didn't sign up for the Eccellenza in 2019 and so dissolved.

History
The club was founded as A.S.D. Santarcangelo as a sports association in 1926. It is the most supported club within the Santarcangelo di Romagna area.

SquadraMia takeover and Lega Pro promotions
After a thorough analysis by the founders of SquadraMia (a non-profit web-venture that aimed to purchase and manage an Italian football team whereby the venture's members vote on matters normally reserved for traditional club management, akin to Ebbsfleet United F.C. in England), between various clubs who were part of a final evaluation stage. On 23 July 2009, ASD Santarcangelo was chosen as the ideal team for their project with 96.4% of total preferences. The association subsequently acquired 10% of the club shares.

In the season 2010–11, Santarcangelo won the Group F of Serie D and was promoted to Lega Pro Seconda Divisione for the first time. After the 2011–12 Lega Pro Seconda Divisione season, the club terminated its agreement with SquadraMia.

Following a fifth place in the 2013–14 Lega Pro Seconda Divisione, Santarcangelo was admitted to the inaugural season of the unified third tier of Italian football, the 2014–15 Lega Pro.

Colors and symbol
The society uses yellow and blue, that appear also in the shield; as team's symbol they have the Romagna's cock.

Ground

The stadium where the team plays home matches, is dedicated to the memory of Valentino Mazzola. Taking into account all sectors, the ground has a capacity of 3000 seats and field dimensions of 65m x 105m.

Players

Former players

References

External links
  

Football clubs in Italy
Serie C clubs
Association football clubs established in 1926
Football clubs in Emilia-Romagna
1926 establishments in Italy